The Pan-Pacific Football Championship was an inter-confederation football tournament between teams from A-League (Australia and New Zealand), Chinese Super League (China), J. League (Japan), K-League (Korea), and Major League Soccer (United States and Canada). 
The event was underwritten by MLS and promoted through its Soccer United Marketing arm.

History
The inaugural edition of the competition took place from February 20 to February 23, 2008 in Honolulu, Hawaii. Four teams took part in the competition.

Houston Dynamo qualified as MLS Cup champions, and Gamba Osaka qualified as champions of the Japanese League Cup. Australia's A-League was represented by the loser of the minor semi final instead of the champion team. This was due to a scheduling conflict with the A-League Preliminary Final on February 17, followed by the Grand Final on February 24, which were moved back so as not to interfere with Australia's 2010 FIFA World Cup qualification campaign. The fourth competitor was originally intended to be the SuperLiga champion, Pachuca, but the club reportedly declined to take part and their place in the competition was awarded to Los Angeles Galaxy.

Teams from China and Korea made their debut in the tournament in the 2009 edition, which was held at the Galaxy's Home Depot Center in Carson, California.

While no official statement has been issued, the tournament was not held in 2010 or 2011. In 2012, Aloha Stadium is scheduled to host the Hawaiian Islands Invitational, a preseason tournament that will also feature teams from Japan, Australia, the United States, and South Korea. A similar tournament, the Pacific Rim Cup, will be held in Honolulu in February 2018, featuring MLS and J League teams.

Results

Statistics

By club

By nation

See also
Hawaiian Islands Invitational

References

 
American soccer friendly trophies